FC Gonio is a Georgian association football club based in Gonio, the southern settlement of Batumi. 

Following the 2022 season, they secured promotion to Liga 4, the fourth tier of the national league system.

History
The club was established in April 2021 and included in Regionuli Liga West Group tournament for the upcoming season. After two initial wins Gonio sustained two straight defeats under manager Giorgi Zoidze and afterwards stayed in midtable. In early July, after Phase 1 was completed, a new head coach was appointed. Irakli Gogichaishvili had previously trained Liga 4 side Betlemi Keda. 

Overall, during the season the team recorded six victories with a large margin, including 8-0 in October. 

The next year Gonio made a debut in David Kipiani Cup, where they beat two opponents, including a third-tier team. Gonio was involved in promotion chase along with two other clubs throughout the league season. They eventually came second in the table and qualified for play-offs. In a crucial game held in Batumi, Gonio cruised to victory over Gldani and advanced promotion to the fourth division for the first time in history.

Seasons

Stadium
The team's home ground is the Central stadium, although some matches occasionally are held also at Akhalsopeli stadium near Khelvachauri.

Name
The town of Gonio is located at a historic place famous for its Roman-era fortress.

References

External Links
Page in Facebook

Gonio Batumi
Batumi
2021 establishments in Georgia (country)